Maharashtra is a state in the western region of India and is India's third-largest state by area. It has over 112 million inhabitants and its capital, Mumbai, has a population of approximately 18 million. Nagpur is Maharashtra's second, or winter, capital. Government in the state is organized on the parliamentary system. Power is devolved to large city councils, district councils (Zila Parishad), sub-district (Taluka) councils, and the village parish councils (Gram panchayat). The politics of the state are dominated by the numerically strong Maratha–Kunbi community. There are national and regional parties in the state, serving different demographics, such as those based on religion, caste, urban and rural residents.

Government structure

State government

The government of Maharashtra is conducted within a framework of parliamentary government, with a bicameral legislature consisting of the Maharashtra Legislative Assembly and the Maharashtra Legislative Council. The legislative assembly (Vidhan Sabha) is the lower chamber and consists of 288 members. There are 25 and 29 seats reserved for the Scheduled Castes and Scheduled Tribes and others, respectively. Members are elected for a five-year term by the First-past-the-post voting electoral system.

The legislative council (Vidhan Parishad) is the upper chamber and is a permanent body of 78 members..Members are elected indirectly in the following manner:

One third are elected by the members of local bodies such as municipalities, Gram panchayats, Panchayat samitis and district councils.
One third are elected by the members of Legislative Assembly of the State from among the persons who are not members of the State Legislative Assembly.
One sixth are nominated by the Governor from persons having knowledge or practical experience in fields such as literature, science, arts, the co-operative movement and social services.
One twelfth are elected by persons who are graduates of three years' standing residing in that state.
One twelfth are elected by teachers who had spent at least three years in teaching in educational institutions within the state not lower than secondary schools, including colleges and universities.

The government of Maharashtra is headed by the chief minister, who is chosen by the party or alliance with a majority of members in the legislative assembly. The chief minister, along with the council of ministers, drives the legislative agenda and exercises most of the executive powers. However, the constitutional and formal head of the state is the governor, who is appointed for a five-year term by the President of India on the advice of the Union government.

Maharashtra in Indian Parliament
Maharashtra elects members to both chambers of the Indian Parliament. Representatives to India's lower chamber, the Lok Sabha, are elected by adult universal suffrage, and a first-past-the-post system, to represent their respective constituencies. They hold their seats for five years or until the body is dissolved by the President on the advice of the council of ministers. Representatives to the upper chamber, the Rajya Sabha, are elected indirectly by the Vidhan Sabha members. Maharashtra elects 48 members out of 543 total elected members of the Lok Sabha and 19 out of 233 elected members of the Rajya Sabha.

Local government

The state has a long tradition of highly powerful planning bodies at district and local levels. Local self governance institutions in rural areas include 34 zilla parishads (district councils), 355 Taluka Panchayat samitis (district Sub-division councils) and 27,993 Gram panchayats (village councils). Urban areas in the state are governed by 27 Municipal Corporations, 222 Municipal Councils, four Nagar Panchayats and seven Cantonment Boards.
Although Maharashtra had Gram panchayat with elected members since 1961, the 73rd amendment to the Indian constitution of 1993 put in place a statutory requirement of 33% of seats on the panchayats reserved for women, the scheduled castes, and the scheduled tribes.

In addition, 33% of the sarpanch (panchayat chief) positions were also reserved for women.
Although the amendment boosted the number of women leaders at the village level, there have been cases of harassment by male members of the panchayat towards the female members of the organisations.

The administration in each district is headed by a District Collector, who belongs to the Indian Administrative Service and is assisted by a number of officers belonging to Maharashtra state services. The Superintendent of Police, an officer belonging to the Indian Police Service and assisted by the officers of the Maharashtra Police Service, maintains law and order in addition to other related issues in each district. The Divisional Forest Officer, an officer belonging to the Indian Forest Service, manages the forests, environment, and wildlife of the district, assisted by the officers of Maharashtra Forest Service and Maharashtra Forest Subordinate Service. Sectoral development in the districts is looked after by the district head of each development department, such as Public Works, Health, Education, Agriculture and Animal Husbandry.

Political parties & alliances

Since its inception in 1960, and also of predecessor states such as Bombay, the politics of Maharashtra has been dominated by the Indian National Congress party for a long period of time. Maharashtra became a bastion of Congress party stalwarts such as Yashwantrao Chavan, Vasantdada Patil, Vasantrao Naik, and Shankarrao Chavan.

Sharad Pawar has been a significant personality in state and national politics for nearly forty years. During his career, he has split Congress twice, with significant consequences for state politics. After his second parting from the Congress party in 1999, Sharad Pawar formed the Nationalist Congress Party (NCP) but joined a Congress-led coalition to form the state government after the 1999 Assembly elections.

The Congress party enjoyed a nearly unchallenged dominance of the state political landscape, until 1995 when the coalition of Shiv Sena and the Bharatiya Janata Party (BJP) secured an overwhelming majority in the state, beginning a period of coalition governments. Shiv Sena was the larger party in the coalition. From 1999 until 2014, the NCP and INC formed one coalition while Shiv Sena and the BJP formed another for three successive elections, which the INC-NCP alliance won. Prithviraj Chavan of the Congress party was the last Chief Minister of Maharashtra under the Congress-NCP alliance that ruled until 2014.

For the 2014 assembly polling, the alliances between the NCP and Congress and between the BJP and Shiv Sena broke down over seat allocations. In the election, the largest number of seats went to the BJP, with 122 seats. The BJP initially formed a minority government under Devendra Fadnavis; but in December 2014, Shiv Sena entered the Government and provided a comfortable majority in the Maharashtra Vidhansabha to the Fadnavis-led government.

In the 2019 Loksabha elections, the BJP and Shivsena fought under the NDA banner, whereas the Congress and NCP were part of the UPA. The two alliances remained intact for the legislative assembly elections in October 2019. The BJP and Shivsena together gained the majority of seats in the assembly but could not form government due to squabbles between the two parties. The BJP–Shivsena alliance came to an end in early November 2019, with Shivsena subsequently forming a new alliance with its longtime rivals, the NCP and Congress, to form the new state government on 28 November 2019. In June 2022, this government collapsed when the majority of the Shiv Sena legislative party, under Eknath Shinde, broke away to form a new coalition with the BJP.

Other parties in the state include the All India Forward Bloc, the Maharashtra Navnirman Sena, the Communist party of India, the Peasant and workers party, the All India Majlis-e Ittihad al-Muslimin, 
Bahujan Vikas Aghadi, the Samajwadi Party, various factions of the dalit-dominated Republican Party of India, the Bahujan Samaj Party, and the Socialist party.

Dominant groups in Maharashtra politics
After the state of Maharashtra was formed on 1 May 1960, the INC was long without a major challenger. The party also enjoyed overwhelming support from the state's influential sugar co-operatives, as well as thousands of other cooperatives, such as rural agricultural cooperatives involved in the marketing of dairy and vegetable produce, cooperative banks and credit unions etc.

For the better part of the late-colonial and early post-independence periods in Bombay state and its successor, Maharashtra state, the politics of the state has been dominated by the mainly rural Maratha–Kunbi caste, which accounts for 31% of the population of Maharashtra. They dominated the cooperative institutions; and with the resultant economic power, controlled politics from the village level to the state Assembly and the Lok Sabha.

In 2016, of the 366 MLAs (Legislative Assembly has 288 MLAs and Legislative Council has 78) combined, 169 (46%) were Marathas. Major past political figures of the Congress party from Maharashtra—such as Keshavrao Jedhe, Yashwantrao Chavan,Vasantdada Patil, Shankarrao Chavan, Vilasrao Deshmukh, and Sharad Pawar—have been from this group. Of the 19 Chief Ministers so far, as many as 10 (55%) have been Maratha. Since the 1980s, politicians from this group has also been active in setting up private educational institutions.

Following disputes between Sharad Pawar and the INC president Sonia Gandhi, the state's political status quo was disturbed when Pawar defected from the INC, which was perceived as the vehicle of the Nehru-Gandhi dynasty, to form the Nationalist Congress Party. This offshoot of the Congress party is nevertheless dominated by the Maratha community.

Shiv Sena was formed in the 1960s by Balashaheb Thackerey, a cartoonist and journalist, to advocate and agitate for the interests of Marathi people in Mumbai. Over the following decades, Shiv Sena slowly expanded, and took over the then Mumbai Municipal corporation in the 1980s.Although the original base of the party was among lower middle and working class Marathi people in Mumbai and the surrounding suburbs, the leadership of the party came from educated groups. However, since 1990s there has been shift in leadership with many middle level leaders creating personal fiefdom for themselves and their families with the use of strong-arm tactics. Hansen has termed this as the "dada-ization" of the party. By the number of Marathas elected on the Shiv Sena ticket in the last few elections, the party is emerging as another Maratha party.

The BJP is closely related to the RSS and is part of the Sangh Parivar. The party originally derived its support from the urban upper castes, such as Brahmins and non-Maharashtrians. In recent years the party has been able to penetrate the Maratha community by fielding Maratha candidates in elections.

The Shiv Sena–BJP coalition came to power at the state level in 1995, which was a blow to the Congress party. In 2006, a split within Shiv Sena emerged when Bal Thackeray anointed his son Uddhav Thackeray as his successor over his nephew Raj Thackeray. Raj Thackeray then left the party and formed a new party called Maharashtra Navnirman Sena (MNS). Raj Thackeray, like his uncle, has also tried to win support from the Marathi community by embracing anti-immigrant sentiment in Maharashtra, for instance against Biharis.

After the Maratha–Kunbi, the former Mahar community, now known as Neobuddhist is  numerically the second largest community. The community falls under the scheduled caste (SC) group. Since the time of B. R. Ambedkar, this community has supported various factions of the Republican Party of India (RPI). There are 25 seats reserved for the SC. Parties such as NCP, BJP, and the Congress field candidates from other SC groups like Mang and Chambhar for the reserved seats, to thwart the candidates of the RPI.

Nepotism and Dynasticism 

Although a parliamentary democracy, Indian politics has increasing become dynastic, possibly due to the absence of a party organization, independent civil society associations that mobilize support for the party, and centralized financing of elections. On the national level family members have led the Congress party for most of the period since 1978 when Indira Gandhi floated the then Congress(I) faction of the party. It is fairly common also in all political parties in Maharashtra.

In the 2019 elections to the lok sabha, 42% of MPS elected from Maharashtra belonged to political families. According to John Mohan Razu, the main reason parties choose candidates from political families is to maximise the party's chances at the ballot box. In most local cases being a dynast remains by and large more of an asset than a liability in Indian context.The dynastic phenomenon is seen from national level down to district level and even at village level. The three-tier structure of Panchayati Raj created in the 1960s also helped to create and consolidate this phenomenon in rural areas. Apart from government, political families in the state also control cooperative institutions, mainly cooperative sugar factories, district cooperative banks and in some cases local unions. in the state 

The ruling Bharatiya Janata Party also features several senior leaders who are dynasts. In Maharashtra, the NCP has particularly high level of dynasticism. The NCP founder, Sharad Pawar has many members of his family such as his daughter Supriya Sule, nephew Ajit Pawar, and other members of the extended family holding prominent positions in the party. In other districts of the state, senior politicians promote their own relatives in their local quasi-fiefdoms. For example in Akluj are of Solapur district, candidates have to be from the Mohite-Patil clan or approved by them. 

Journalist Gopal Joshi argues that ideology has taken a backseat in the state politics with some dynastic families such as the Vikhe Patil of Ahmadnagar district making journey from communism in the first generation to the rightwing BJP in the present generation. Although Dynasticism is a powerful factor in the state politics, feuds amongst family members can lead to members launching their own parties as was the case of Raj Thackeray leaving Shiv sena and forming the Maharashtra Navnirman Sena

2014 Assembly Election

The 2014 assembly election followed a landslide national victory of the BJP in the 2014 Lok Sabha election, which brought the Narendra Modi to power as prime minister. All major parties in the state (BJP, Shivsena, INC, and NCP) contested the elections on their own, leading to a complex and much-contested election. The BJP put together an alliance of forward castes, the Other Backward Class (OBC), and to some extent the Dalit to fight the Maratha-led Congress and NCP. The results were significant in that the BJP received the highest number of seats, despite being historically smaller than Shiv Sena in the state. Although the BJP still required Shiv Sena's support to form a majority, it progressed from being a minor party in state politics to the party of the chief minister, Devendra Fadnavis, who held that position until November 2019.

2019 Lok Sabha elections

In April 2019, voting for the 48 Lok Sabha seats from Maharashtra was held in four phases.

Despite their differences, the BJP and Shiv Sena once again contested the elections together under the National Democratic Alliance (NDA) banner. Similarly, the Congress and NCP had their own seat-sharing arrangement. The breakaway party of Raj Thakeray, Maharashtra Navnirman Sena, did not contest any seats, and instead urged their supporters to vote for the NCP–Congress alliance, Thakre campaigning for candidates belonging to these parties.

The results of the election on 23 May 2019 was another landslide victory for the NDA, with the BJP and Shiv Sena winning 23 and 18 seats, respectively, out of the total of the state's 48 Lok Sabha seats. The Congress party won only one seat in the state whereas the NCP won five seats from its stronghold of western Maharashtra.

2019 Vidhan Sabha elections

The BJP–Shiv-Sena and NCP–Congress alliances remained intact for the Vidhansabha elections in October 2019. The BJP and Shiv Sena together gained the majority of seats in the assembly but could not form government due to squabbles between the two parties. The BJP, with 105 seats, was far short of the 145 seats required to form majority and declined to form a minority government. At the same time, Shiv Sena started talks with the NCP and Congress to form government.

On 23 November 2019, BJP formed a government with support from NCP, with Ajit Pawar as Deputy Chief Minister. This government collapsed three days later with Chief Minister Devendra Fadnavis and Ajit Pawar resigning their respective positions. On 28 November 2019, the governor swore in Uddhav Thackeray, the Shiv Sena chief, as the new chief minister of Maharashtra. Thackeray's governing coalition included Shiv Sena, NCP, INC, and a number of independent members of legislative assembly . The Uddhav Thackeray led government collapsed in June 2022 due to rebellion inside the Shivsena party.

2022 Shiv sena rebellion and change of government
The Uddhav Thackeray led Maha Vikas Aghadi (MVA) coalition began to unravel in late June 2022  when Eknath Shinde, a senior Shiv Sena leader, along with several other MLAs of the party moved to Surat in BJP governed Gujarat throwing the coalition into a crisis. Shiv Sena leaders accused the BJP for causing the revolt within Shiv Sena and attempting to topple the MVA coalition government. Since the majority of Shivsena legislative party sided with Shinde, attempts by Thackeray to disqualify the dissenting members using the anti-defection law were unsuccessful. Given this situatiuon, Uddhav Thackeray decided to resign from the post as chief minister well as a MLC member ahead of no-confidence motion on 29 June 2022. The resignation of Thackeray saw the cancellation of the floor test.Shinde subsequently formed a new coalition with the BJP. On June 30 2022 he was sworn in as  the Chief Minister and Devendra Fadnavis as the Deputy Chief Minister.

See also

2009 Maharashtra Legislative Assembly election
2004 Maharashtra Legislative Assembly election
List of Chief Ministers of Maharashtra
Panchayat Samiti
Gram panchayat

References

Further reading
 

 
Marathi people